The Decree Against Communism was a 1949 Catholic Church document issued by the Supreme Sacred Congregation of the Holy Office, and approved by Pope Pius XII, which declared Catholics who professed communist doctrine to be excommunicated as apostates from the Christian faith.

Background
Opposition to socialism and communism in Catholic social teaching had already been expressed in the teachings of popes since the encyclicals Nostis et nobiscum (1849), Quanta cura (1864), and Rerum novarum (1891).

In the earlier social encyclicals, the criticism of communism described it as a system violating human rights: e.g., the right to own property.  After revolutions in Russia, China, and Mexico had been followed by religious persecution, a new theme of criticism was added, beginning with Quadragesimo anno (1931) by Pope Pius XI.  This encyclical objected to what it considered to be communism's professed opposition to religion, and its threat to the freedom and the very existence of the Church. In 1937, Pius XI rejected atheistic communism in an encyclical entitled Divini Redemptoris as "a system full of errors and sophisms", with a "pseudo-ideal of justice, equality, and fraternity" and "a certain false mysticism", and contrasted it with a humane society (civitas humana).

After the Italian parliamentary election of April 1948, in which the communist-socialist coalition won 31% of the vote, the Holy Office began to study the issue of communism in order to give guidance to Catholic lay people and clergy with questions about support for communist parties.

An additional impulse for Vatican action against communism arose in Czechoslovakia, where the communist government, installed by a coup d'état in February 1948, undertook a campaign to take control of the Catholic Church by several means. Among other measures, it created an organization of priests favorable to the regime, took control of church finances, and demanded that pastoral letters to the faithful or the clergy be approved by government ministries.

On July 15, 1948, L'Osservatore Romano published a decree which excommunicated those who propagate "the materialistic and anti-Christian teachings of Communism". The document, however, did not mention the Italian Communist Party, which had changed its statutes in 1946, removing an explicit profession of Marxism-Leninism, and opening to participation by citizens, "independent of race, religious faith or philosophical convictions".

In the spring of 1949, pressure on the Church in Czechoslovakia was increasing, and, according to Cardinal Giovanni Battista Montini, then papal Secretary of State, Pope Pius XII, had come to feel that there would be no effective diplomatic opposition from the West. Thus, the Church had to use what means it had to confront communism, not only in the immediate situation, but for a long-term opposition.

Form of the document
The document, as published in the Acta Apostolicae Sedis, bears the date July 1, 1949 and the heading Decretum (Decree), and is presented in the form of a dubium: that is, in question-and-answer format. It presents four questions, together with the Holy Office's replies: (1) Is it licit to join or show favor to Communist parties? (2) Is it licit to publish, distribute, or read publications that support Communist doctrine or activity, or to write for them? (3) May Christians who knowingly and freely commit the acts in parts 1 and 2 be given the sacraments? (4) Do Christians who profess, defend, or promote materialistic Communist doctrine incur the penalty of excommunication as apostates from the Christian faith, with the penalty reserved so that it may only be lifted by the Holy See?

The answers in the decree were negative to the first three questions and affirmative to the fourth.

Publication and reception
After the document was approved by Pius XII on June 30, the text of the document was delivered to printers to prepare its release. Shortly thereafter, it was leaked to the press, and so appeared in public early, with no advance notice to the clergy and no commentary to explain the document.

The decree was published in the Vatican newspaper L'Osservatore Romano on July 16, 1949. A commentary followed on July 27, 1949, explaining reasons for its condemnation of communist activity and doctrine. It also made clear the scope of the excommunication stated in the decree: it did not apply to all people who voted for communists or supported the party, but only to people who held the materialistic and atheistic doctrines of communism.

The Decree met with some surprising public support despite the disorder around its publication: from Protestant countries, there was favorable commentary which recognized the decree as a response to communist pressure on the Church in Eastern Europe. The United States urged the Patriarch of Constantinople Athenagoras, who supported the decree, to issue a similar document for the Eastern Orthodox world.

Response from pro-communist newspapers in Italy was sharply critical, but the Soviet press was silent.  Italian Communist Party General Secretary Palmiro Togliatti was restrained in his criticism, inasmuch as many party supporters were practicing Catholics.

Repercussions
In the wake of the Decree, Pope Pius XII encouraged efforts to develop Catholic social teaching and thus counteract the appeal of communist social doctrine. The Decree marked the beginning of a long institutional conflict between Catholicism and communism. The Holy Office issued later documents condemning communism:
 Excommunication of Bishop Dechet, February 18, 1950,
 Membership in communist youth organizations, September 28, 1950,
 Usurpation of Church functions by the State, June 29, 1950,
 Illegitimate state ordered ordinations of bishops, April 9, 1951,
 Publications favouring totalitarian Communism, June 28 and July 22, 1955,

A further dubium dated April 4, 1959 from the Holy Office made the provisions of the 1949 Decree more specific, stating that it implied a prohibition on voting for parties that were helping communists, even if such parties themselves had inoffensive doctrines or even called themselves Christian.

References

External links 
 Text of the Decree on the Montfort website
 Official publication in Acta Apostolicae Sedis, n. 41 (page 334)

Anti-communism
Disengagement from religion
Pope Pius XII foreign relations
Holy See–Soviet Union relations
Documents of Pope Pius XII
1949 documents
1949 in Christianity
Against Communism